Maulvi Qudratullah Abu Hamza is an Afghan Taliban politician and commander  who served as governor of Balkh province from August 2021 until some time in 2022.

References

Living people
Taliban governors
Taliban commanders
Governors of Balkh Province
Year of birth missing (living people)